The Road to Rampton is a 2007 album released on CD by English punk rock band the Anti-Nowhere League. It was also released as a special collectors edition in 2011 on both vinyl and CD.

Track listing
 "Good As It Gets"
 "Short, Sharp, Shock"
 "Unwanted"
 "Never Drink Alone"
 "Mother... You're a Liar"
 "Turn To Shit"
 "Bitter and Twisted"
 "Time is Running Out"
 "Run"
 "Beware The Madman"
 "Big Yellow Moon"
 "My Gods Bigger Than Yours"
 "Medication"
 "Self Harm"
 "The End of the Day"
 "Rampton"

Anti-Nowhere League albums
2007 albums